Rheinau Abbey (Kloster Rheinau) was a Benedictine monastery in Rheinau in the Canton of Zürich, Switzerland, founded in about 778 and suppressed in 1862. It is located on an island in the Rhine.

History
The foundation of the abbey, on a strategically sheltered bend of the Rhine, is supposed to have taken place in about 778. In the ninth century, the community number forty-three, about half of whom were ordained priests. St. Findan was from Ireland; after escaping Viking slavers, he lived at the abbey as a hermit for twenty-two years.

In 1114 a Romanesque basilica was dedicated here and in 1120 the still extant archive begun. The early history of the abbey, like that of many others, consists of an alternation between generous endowments and privileges from the Holy Roman Emperors, and oppression and fraud from the "Vögte" (lords protector). In 1126 Count Rudolf of Lenzburg founded the adjoining settlement of Rheinau. The abbey’s scriptorium flourished in the twelfth century.

Against the increasingly aggressive territorial claims of the Counts of Sulz the abbey made a treaty in 1455 with the Old Swiss Confederacy, which was intended to protect it against further attacks by the noble families of the Klettgau. In 1529 the Reformation swept in from Zürich and overwhelmed the abbey, which was abandoned shortly afterwards. It was re-established however in 1532, and became a centre of the Counter-reformation.

In the 18th century under Abbot Gerold II Zurlauben, Rheinau Abbey, like St. Gallen, enjoyed a late resurgence.  Abbot Gerold II Zurlauben had the monastic complex (in construction up to 1744) magnificently re-built in the Baroque style, much as they appear today. Franz Beer worked on the abbey church which was re-dedicated 1710.

During the turmoil of the French Revolution and the French invasion of Switzerland in 1798, the abbey was temporarily suspended, but restored in 1803. The abbey's territory with the little town of Rheinau were added to the newly restored Canton of Zürich, which placed it under cantonal supervision in 1834 and from 1836 prevented it from accepting new novices. In 1862 the cantonal council decreed the dissolution of the abbey.

From 1603 until its dissolution the abbey was a member of the Swiss Congregation, now part of the Benedictine Confederation.

[Kloster Rheinau:,

After dissolution
In 1867 in the abbey buildings a cantonal hospital and nursing home were set up. The later cantonal psychiatric clinic that developed here was closed in 2000, since when the buildings have stood empty.

References

External links 

  Rheinau Abbey: history and pictures 

Benedictine monasteries in Switzerland
Buildings and structures in the canton of Zürich
Churches in the canton of Zürich
Islands of the Rhine
River islands of Switzerland
Christian monasteries established in the 8th century
8th-century establishments in Switzerland
1862 disestablishments in Switzerland
Cultural property of national significance in the canton of Zürich
Baroque church buildings  in Switzerland
Religious buildings and structures completed in 778